The Bluegrass Sessions is the sixty-first studio album by American country music singer and songwriter Merle Haggard. This album was released on October 2, 2007, on the McCoury Music and Hag Records.

The bulk of the album was cut live in the studio in one day, with very little overdubbing. Guests include Alison Krauss, Marty Stuart and dobro virtuoso Rob Ickes. It was produced by Ronnie Reno, former rhythm guitarist of The Strangers.

Track listing
All songs written by Merle Haggard except where noted.

 "Runaway Momma" – 3:49
 "Pray" – 2:53
 "What Happened?" – 3:42
 "Jimmie Rodgers Blues" – 4:17
 "Learning to Live with Myself" – 4:09
 "Mama's Hungry Eyes" (with Alison Krauss) – 3:37
 "I Wonder Where To Find You" – 2:54
 "Holding Things Together" – 3:25
 "Big City" (Haggard, Dean Holloway) – 3:38
 "Momma's Prayers" – 4:08
 "Wouldn't That Be Something" (Merle Haggard, Freddy Powers) – 3:28
 "Blues Stay Away From Me" (Alton Delmore, Rabon Delmore, Henry Glover, Wayne Raney) – 3:45

Chart performance

Personnel
 Merle Haggard – Guitar, Vocals 
 Ronnie Reno – Producer, Mixing 
 John Caldwell – Engineer 
 Charlie Cushman – Banjo, Guitar 
 Randy Garrett – Cover Illustration 
 Lee Groitzsch – Engineer, Mixing 
 Aubrey Haynie – Fiddle 
 Rob Ickes – Dobro, Slide Guitar 
 Ben Isaacs – Upright Bass
 Carl Jackson – Guitar, Tenor Vocal, Vocal Arrangement, Vocal Producer 
 Scott Joss – Fiddle 
 J.D. Wilkes – Harmonica
 Alison Krauss – Vocals 
 Brenda McClearen – Photography 
 Teeroy Morris – Graphic Design 
 Marty Stuart – Guitar, Mandolin

References

2007 albums
Merle Haggard albums